A wind rose is a graphic tool used by meteorologists to give a succinct view of how wind speed and direction are typically distributed at a particular location. Historically, wind roses were predecessors of the compass rose (found on charts), as there was no differentiation between a cardinal direction and the wind which blew from such a direction.  Using a polar coordinate system of gridding, the frequency of winds over a time period is plotted by wind direction, with colour bands showing wind speed ranges.  The direction of the longest spoke shows the wind direction with the greatest frequency.

History 

Before the development of the compass rose, a wind rose was included on maps in order to let the reader know which directions the 8 major winds (and sometimes 8 half-winds and 16 quarter-winds) blew within the plan view.  No differentiation was made between cardinal directions and the winds which blew from those directions.  North was depicted with a fleur de lis, while east was shown as a Christian cross to indicate the direction of Jerusalem from Europe.

Use 
Presented in a circular format, the modern wind rose shows the frequency of winds blowing from particular directions over a specified period.  The length of each "spoke" around the circle is related to the frequency that the wind blows from a particular direction per unit time.  Each concentric circle represents a different frequency, emanating from zero at the center to increasing frequencies at the outer circles.  A wind rose plot may contain additional information, in that each spoke is broken down into colour-coded bands that show wind speed ranges.  Wind roses typically use 16 cardinal directions, such as north (N), NNE, NE, etc., although they may be subdivided into as many as 32 directions. In terms of angle measurement in degrees, North corresponds to 0°/360°, East to 90°, South to 180° and West to 270°.

Compiling a wind rose is one of the preliminary steps taken in constructing airport runways, as aircraft can have a lower ground speed at both landing and takeoff when pointing against the wind.

See also
 Pelorus (instrument)
 Compass rose
 Rhumbline network
 Wind Rose (band)

References

External links 

Wind Rose Data for the U.S.

 

Wind
Navigation
Róża wiatrów